Super Polsat is a Polish television channel, launched on 2 January 2017. The channel provides programming with audio description and closed captioning for visually and hearing impaired.

On 6 April 2020 the logos and graphics of several Polsat group channels were changed, including Super Polsat.

The logo was changed again, on August 30, 2021, with the major rebranding of Polsat, and it's television channels.

Programming
Super Polsat broadcasts shows known from Polsat, such as e.g. Dancing with the Stars. Taniec z gwiazdami, Must Be the Music. Tylko muzyka, Wyspa przetrwania; TV series, for instance Przyjaciółki (also a few foreign: Grey's Anatomy, CSI: NY); news service Wydarzenia 22.00 (at 6 am as a re-run from Polsat News) and classic Polish films.

 Joker  – game show licensed form French Joker (2017–2018);
 SuperLudzie  – documentary series about impaired people (2017–2019);
 Taxi kasa  – game show licensed from British Cash Cab (2018);
Pierwsza klasa  – a pseudo-documentary series licensed from Dutch Brugklas (2018);
Małe wielkie marzenia  – impaired people's home makeovers (2018);
Pozytywka SuperMagazyn – documentary series about impaired people's everyday life (2018);
Flesz Integracja – news magazine about issues of handicapped persons (2018).
Bubble Guppies - animated TV series (also on Nickelodeon and Nick Jr.)
The Fairly OddParents - animated TV series (also on Nickelodeon)
Nella the Princess Knight - animated 2D series (also on Nick Jr.)
Paw Patrol - animated CGI series (also on Nick Jr.)
iCarly - comedy series (also on Nickelodeon)

References

External links
 

Polsat
Television channels in Poland
Television channels and stations established in 2017
2017 establishments in Poland
Polish-language television stations
Mass media in Warsaw